Syngamus merulae  is a parasitic nematode worm infecting the tracheas of birds including thrushes. It is closely related to the gapeworm, Syngamus trachea.

References

Cited texts 
 

Strongylida
Parasites of birds